The Otter Sandstone Formation is an obsolete geological unit in England, now referred to as the Helsby Sandstone Formation. It preserves fossils dated to the Triassic, Anisian period.

See also 
 List of fossiliferous stratigraphic units in England

References 

Geologic formations of England
Triassic System of Europe
Triassic England
Anisian Stage
Sandstone formations